Maria Anna Fisher (1819–1911), also known as Anna Maria Fisher, was an African American baker, entrepreneur and philanthropist. Beginning around 1834, at the age of 15, she sold homemade biscuits door to door in Philadelphia, Pennsylvania at 12.5 cents each. With her earnings she eventually purchased a fourteen-room house and more than a dozen other houses that she rented out for additional income. She never raised the price for her biscuits.

Death and legacy
Fisher died in 1911 and left a $70,000 estate to charities, including the Tuskegee Institute and the Hampton Institute.

References

1819 births
1911 deaths
African-American businesspeople
American bakers
Businesspeople from Philadelphia
Philanthropists from Pennsylvania
19th-century American businesspeople
19th-century American businesswomen
19th-century American philanthropists
20th-century African-American people
20th-century African-American women